Nataliya Sukhorukova is a Ukrainian former football midfielder who played for Lehenda Chernihiv and Zhilstroy Kharkiv in the Ukrainian League and the European Cup. She was a member of the Ukrainian national team for sixteen years, taking part in the 2009 European Championship, where she was the most experienced player in the squad after Olena Mazurenko.

References

1975 births
Living people
People from the Crimean Oblast
Ukrainian women's footballers
Ukraine women's international footballers
WFC Lehenda-ShVSM Chernihiv players
WFC Zhytlobud-1 Kharkiv players
WFC Donchanka Donetsk players
WFC Spartak Kyiv players
Women's association football midfielders
Ukrainian expatriate sportspeople in Russia
Ukrainian expatriate sportspeople in Poland